Mister Twister is a Russian rockabilly band. The band was formed in 1985 when rock’n’roll music was allowed in the Soviet Union. After 20 days of constant rehearsals they took the stage. The record label Melodiya issued their first album, Ми́стер Тви́стер, that sold 1.7 million copies.

Discography 
 1990 — Мистер Твистер (Mister Twister) (Melodiya, 1990)
 1991 — Девки, пиво и рок-н-ролл (Chix, Beer and Rock 'n' Roll) (1991 "SNC" LP, CD; 1994 "Союз" MC)
 1996 — Первые Твисты (The Early Twists) (CD; MC "Союз")
 1999 — Миллионер (The Millionaire) (MC CD "Экстрафон")
 2002 — Имена На Все Времена (The Names of All Time) (compilation)
 2004 — Live in Schwein 
 2005 — Rocker

External links 
 

Russian rock music groups
Rock and roll music groups
Rockabilly music groups
Musical groups from Moscow
Soviet rock music groups